Myotubularin domain represents a region within eukaryotic myotubularin-related proteins that is sometimes found with the GRAM domain . Myotubularin is a dual-specific lipid phosphatase that dephosphorylates phosphatidylinositol 3-phosphate and phosphatidylinositol (3,5)-bi-phosphate. Mutations in gene encoding myotubularin-related proteins have been associated with disease.

Human proteins containing this domain 
MTM1;      MTMR1;     MTMR10;    MTMR11;    MTMR12;    MTMR2;     MTMR3;     MTMR4;
MTMR6;     MTMR7;     MTMR8;     MTMR9;     SBF1;      SBF2;

References

External links
  - Myotubularin phosphatase domain in PROSITE

Protein domains
Peripheral membrane proteins